Valentino Fattore Scotta (born 10 August 2001) is a professional footballer who plays as a right back for Sevilla Atlético. Born in Argentina, he is a youth international for Spain.

Club career
Born in Buenos Aires, Fattore moved to Spain at early age, and joined Sevilla FC's at the age of eight, from local side AD Nervión. He made his senior debut with the C-team on 16 September 2018, aged 17, by starting in a 1–2 Tercera División home loss against Córdoba CF B.

Fattore first appeared with the reserves on 21 April 2019, coming on as a second-half substitute for Chris Ramos in a 1–2 home loss against Recreativo de Huelva. He was definitely promoted to the B-side ahead of the 2020–21 campaign, and renewed his contract until 2023 on 23 February 2021.

Fattore made his first team – and La Liga – debut on 21 December 2021, replacing Lucas Ocampos late into a 1–1 home draw against FC Barcelona.

International career
Born in Argentina and raised in Spain, Fattore is of Italian descent through his father, and therefore holds Argentine, Italian, and Spanish nationalities. He represented the latter's under-19 team in a 1–1 friendly with Italy on 15 January 2020.

Personal life
Fattore's grandfather Héctor Scotta was also a footballer. A forward, he represented Sevilla in the late 1970s.

References

External links
 
 
 

2001 births
Living people
Footballers from Buenos Aires
Spanish footballers
Argentine footballers
Spanish people of Argentine descent
Spanish people of Italian descent
Argentine people of Italian descent
Argentine emigrants to Spain
Association football fullbacks
La Liga players
Primera Federación players
Segunda División B players
Tercera División players
Sevilla FC C players
Sevilla Atlético players
Sevilla FC players
Spain youth international footballers